American Progress is an 1872 painting by John Gast, a Prussian-born painter, printer, and lithographer who lived and worked most of his life during 1870s Brooklyn, New York. American Progress, an allegory of manifest destiny, was widely disseminated in chromolithographic prints. It is now held by the Autry Museum of the American West in Los Angeles, California.

Description
American Progress has become a seminal example of American Western art. The painting serves as an allegory for Manifest Destiny and American westward expansion. The  painting was commissioned in 1872 by George Crofutt, a publisher of American Western travel guides, and has since been frequently reproduced. The woman in the center is Columbia, the personification of the United States, and on her head is what Crofutt calls "The Star of the Empire". Columbia moves from the light-skied east to the dark and treacherous West, leading settlers who follow her either on foot or by stagecoach, horseback, Conestoga wagon, wagon train, or riding steam trains. Progress lays a telegraph wire with one hand and carries a school book in the other. On the right side of the painting, in the East, New York City can be seen in the background, while farmers that have already settled in the Midwest are featured in the foreground. As Lady Columbia moves westward, indigenous people and a herd of buffalo flee from her and the settlers who follow.

References

External links
Essay on Spirit of the frontier by historian Martha A. Sandweiss of Amherst College Includes high resolution version of the painting.
The Library of Congress:
Works by Gast from the Department of Drawings and Prints
Entry in Goulding's New York City directory (1877), listing him as GAST JOHN, artist & lithographer, 39 Park pl. h B'klyn
Short biography, list of references, and examples of work on askart.com
Works by Gast in the general Catalog
New approved method of zinc etching or photo-zinc-engraving (1886), by Gast
Beyond "American Progress": The Legacy of John Gast by Samantha Rothenberg

1872 paintings
Paintings in Los Angeles
Bears in art
Bison in art
Books in art
Cattle in art
Deer in art
Horses in art
Native Americans in art
Trains in art
Water in art
Wolves in art